Hemicrepidius guizhouensis is a species of click beetle belonging to the family Elateridae. It is endemic to China.

References

Beetles described in 1996
Endemic fauna of China
guizhouensis